

EP 1 Odd Year & The Reverb Junkie is the first collaborative EP release by the duo Odd Year (David Gonzalez) and The Reverb Junkie (Michelle Chamuel). It was released in September 2012. The duo had previously released a single titled "Might Not Happen" in January 2012.

Track listing

Personnel 
Credits adapted from Bandcamp music store.

 The Reverb Junkie (Michelle Chamuel) – writer, performer, producer, vocals
 Odd Year (David Gonzalez) – writer, performer, producer, mixing
 Robert Lux (Robert Lester) – mastering
 Ena Bacanovic (Ruby Soho) – album art

Remixes
 Don't Say It Didn't Hurt (Odd Year & The Reverb Junkie Club Mix)

References

2012 EPs
Michelle Chamuel EPs